The 2017–2018 All-Ireland Intermediate Club Football Championship is the 15th annual gaelic football club championship since its establishment in the 2003-04 season. The winners of the intermediate club championship in each county enter the competition.

The 2016-17 champions were Westport from Mayo who defeated St. Colmcille's of Meath on 19 February 2017 to win their 1st title.

Format

County Championships

Ireland's 32 counties play their county championships between their intermediate gaelic football clubs. Each county decides the format for determining their county champions. The format can be straight knockout, double-elimination, a league or a combination.

Provincial Championships

Connacht, Leinster, Munster and Ulster each organise a provincial championship for their participating county champions. All matches are knock-out and two ten minute periods of extra time are played if it's a draw at the end of normal time.

All-Ireland

Two semi-finals are usually played on a Saturday in late January. The All-Ireland intermediate final is normally played in Croke Park in early February.

County Finals

Connacht

Galway IFC

Leitrim IFC

Mayo IFC

Roscommon IFC

Sligo IFC

Leinster
Carlow IFC

Dublin IFC

Ballyboughal, Garda, Naomh Fionnbarra and Trinity Gaels first teams all lost out to reserve sides at the Quarter-Final stages. Rules state that no reserve side can participate in a provincial competition so a play-off between these four sides took place. Ballyboughal defeated Naomh Fionnbarra in the final and hence qualified to represent Dublin in the Leinster Intermediate Club Football Championship.

Kildare IFC

Kilkenny SFC

The Kilkenny senior champions compete in the All-Ireland intermediate club championship.

Laois IFC

Longford IFC

Louth IFC

Meath IFC

Offaly Senior B

Westmeath IFC

Wexford IFC

Wicklow IFC

Munster
Clare IFC

Cork PIFC

Kerry IFC

Limerick IFC

Tipperary IFC

Waterford IFC

Ulster
Antrim IFC

Armagh IFC

Cavan IFC

Derry IFC

Donegal IFC 

Down IFC

Fermanagh IFC 

Monaghan IFC

Tyrone IFC

Provincial championships

Connacht Intermediate Club Football Championship

Connacht Quarter-Final

Connacht Semi-Finals

Connacht Final

Leinster Intermediate Club Football Championship

The Kilkenny senior football champions compete in the All-Ireland Intermediate Club Football Championship.

Leinster Preliminary Round

Leinster Quarter-Finals

Leinster Semi-Finals

Leinster Final

Munster Intermediate Club Football Championship

Munster Quarter-Finals

Munster Semi-Finals

Munster Final

Ulster Intermediate Club Football Championship

Ulster Preliminary Round

Ulster Quarter-Finals

Ulster Semi-Finals

Ulster Final

All-Ireland

All-Ireland Bracket

All-Ireland Semi-Finals

All-Ireland final

References

All-Ireland Intermediate Club Football Championship
All-Ireland Intermediate Club Football Championship